Glover Archbold Park is a 183-acre, frequently-used, quasi-natural, stream-valley park in Northwest, Washington, D.C., on the western edge of Georgetown University and the Burleith-Hillandale, Glover Park, McLean Gardens, and Westchester neighborhoods. The park includes a historical Victory Garden adjacent to W Street, N.W as well as Foundry Branch from Van Ness Street, to Canal Road, along the Potomac River. Several temporary streams, some originating from springs, flow into Foundry Branch. One of the "finger parks" of Rock Creek Park, the Glover-Archbold Park is administered by the National Park Service (NPS). The removal of anything from the natural areas of the park is prohibited. In addition, to aid in preservation, the NPS prohibits off-leash dogs, bicycles, and motorized vehicles in the park. Dog walkers, hikers, and joggers often visit the park. Nature, Gardens, and Georgetown (2006) includes a chapter on the park.

History
Glover Archbold Park is named after Charles Carroll Glover and Anne Mills Archbold, who donated its land in 1924. The Glover family's pronunciation of its name is "glove' er." The National Park Service currently does not hyphenate "Glover Archbold Park." Some people erroneously call the park Glover Archibald Park.

In 1947, Senator Carl Hayden proposed to build a four-lane divided highway called Arizona Avenue through the Glover Archbold Park, from Canal Road in Georgetown to Wisconsin Avenue in Friendship Heights. Hayden's proposed highway was not built; the path is now the Glover Archbold Trail and the Massachusetts-39th Trail. Weaver Street and Weaver Place were renamed Arizona Avenue in 1954 after a suggestion by the American University Park Citizens' Association. In 1963, the conservationist and writer Rachel Carson, accompanied by several members of the Audubon Naturalist Society, visited Glover Archbold Park. Georgetown University students have been studying and learning from the park since at least 1975.

Ecology

The park contains thousands of species in the life domains Archaea, Bacteria, and Eukarya. There may be over 200 fungus species in the park, including artist's fungus, black locust shelf fungus, hedge-hog fungus, hen-of-the-woods, pear-shaped puffball, and turkey-tail fungus.  Its trees include ashleaf maples, American beeches, American elms, black haws, cottonwoods, eastern redbuds, eastern sycamores, princesstrees, spicebushes, trees-of-heaven, tuliptrees, and white oaks.  Its spring ephemerals include spring-beauties and cutleaf toothworts.  Other wildflowers in the park are asters, elephant's-foot, wingstem, and yellow jewelweed.  Two native plant species that are evidently now extinct in the park are round-lobed hepatica and trailing arbutus.  Both ground and climbing forms of poison-ivy are common in Glover Archbold Park.  In about 2000, highly pestiferous Asian tiger mosquitoes first appeared in the park.  In 2004, adult 17-year cicadas were common there.  A rare harvester butterfly was seen in the park. Some of its other insects are black swallowtails, Chinese mantids, eastern carpenter bees, eastern-tailed blues, eastern tiger swallowtails, Andrena erigeniae bees, false honey ants, impatient bumblebees, imperial moths, monarchs, Peck's skippers, Pennsylvania soldier beetles, sachem skippers, silver-spotted skippers, spicebush swallowtails, spring azures, summer azures, western honey bees, and zebra swallowtails. The park has a significant invasion of nonnative plants, including Asiatic bittersweet, bamboo, common periwinkle, English ivy, garlic-mustard, gill-over-the-ground, Japanese honeysuckle, lesser celandine, wild-garlic, and wintercreeper. Once a 2-foot tall, nonnative, tropical papaya seedling grew in the stream bed. Because people have altered the park's landscape so much, native fish are no longer in the stream. Eastern box turtles, frogs, and toads are rare or extinct in the park, not to mention American black bears, American elk, bison, and timber wolves which once lived in the Washington, D.C. area. Its birds include American robins, barred owls, blue jays, Carolina wrens, catbirds, common crows, fish crows, northern cardinals, northern mockingbirds, and wood thrushes.  Mammals in the park include common raccoons, coyotes, domestic cats, domestic dogs, gray foxes, humans, short-tailed shrews, Virginia opossums, white-footed mice, and white-tailed deer.

Park challenges

Many things have and are degrading Glover Archbold Park, including air, fertilizer, soil, and water pollution. The sewer system in and near Foundry Branch has changed this stream's course.  The park sometimes smells of sewage. Storms periodically cause a strong current in the stream, resulting in erosion, disturbance of stream life, and pollution of its water with road runoff and even raw sewage.  People, who are likely unwary of the polluted condition of the water, allow their dogs to drink and walk and bathe in the water.  The park is long and narrow (up to 0.25 mile wide and 2.6 miles long), and mostly surrounded by houses and other buildings.  Some people extend their yards into the park, and the NPS asks them to stop this practice.

References

External links

Parks in Washington, D.C.
Parks on the National Register of Historic Places in Washington, D.C.
Rock Creek Park
Georgetown (Washington, D.C.)